The Treaty of London of 1641 brought an end to the Bishops' Wars between England and Scotland. The Bishops' Wars were an early part of the greater conflict now known as the Wars of the Three Kingdoms.

In 1637, King Charles of England, Scotland and Ireland tried to impose a new Prayer Book, based on that of the Church of England, on the Church of Scotland (the Kirk). The attempt aroused patriotic and religious outrage, and many Scots signed the National Covenant in protest. Another grievance was that General Assemblies of the Kirk had voted to abolish the office of bishop, and Charles seemed determined to reinstate it. Charles raised troops in England to invade Scotland and enforce his will. The result was war.

On 28 August 1640, a Scottish army defeated an English army at the Battle of Newburn, in Northumberland. On 26 October, Charles and the Covenanters signed the Treaty of Ripon as a preliminary to a more detailed and permanent treaty. Meanwhile, the Scottish army was to be allowed to occupy Northumberland and County Durham, and was to be paid £850 per day for its upkeep. Further, the Scots were promised that they would be reimbursed for the expenses they had incurred because of the wars.

Charles was desperately short of money, and summoned the Parliament of England in the hope that they would pass financial supply bills to solve his problem. That Parliament (which sat until 1660 and became known as the Long Parliament) first met on 3 November, and turned out be not at all subservient to his wishes. A week later, Scottish commissioners (John Smith of Grothill and Hugh Kennedy of Ayr) arrived in London to finalise a treaty. Charles denounced the Scottish army as rebel invaders, but the commissioners were welcomed by the Puritans of London, and he withdrew his remarks. 

Scottish and English commissioners continued negotiations into the middle of 1641. The King was in a weak position: there was civil unrest in London, and Parliament had impeached his two chief ministers, the Earl of Strafford and Archbishop Laud (they were later to be executed). He therefore made several unexpected concessions. The resolutions of the General Assemblies of the Kirk which abolished the office of bishop were ratified. The royal castles at Edinburgh and Dumbarton were to be used for defensive purposes only. No Scot would be censured or persecuted for signing the National Covenant. The Scottish "incendiaries" considered responsible for precipitating the crisis would be prosecuted in Scotland. Scottish goods and ships captured during the war would be returned. Publications against the Covenanters would be suppressed. It was also agreed that the Scots would be paid £300,000, a sum which Parliament characterised as "brotherly assistance". The Scottish commissioners too were keen to conclude negotiations, feeling that they had outstayed their welcome. They had denounced episcopacy (bishoprics) in the Church of England, and had spoken and written against Strafford and Laud; and, their hosts had told them that that was none of their business. They dropped their demand that Presbyterianism be adopted throughout the Three Kingdoms, and not only in Scotland. The Treaty was signed on 10 August 1641.

Charles visited Scotland from August to November, giving out favours. However, the underlying tensions within his kingdoms still remained, and the Bishops' Wars turned out to be only the initial conflicts in the Wars of the Three Kingdoms, which ended only with his trial and execution in 1649.

References

London
London
London
England–Scotland relations
1641 in England
1641 in Scotland
London
Wars of the Three Kingdoms